Argylia adscendens is a species of perennial plant in the family Bignoniaceae. It is found in Chile.

References

External links

adscendens
Plants described in 1845